Wallace Smith Murray (1887–1965) was a Career Foreign Service Officer from Ohio who served as Ambassador Extraordinary and Plenipotentiary To Iran (appointed February 20, 1945; Presentation of Credentials: June 5, 1945; Termination of Mission: Left post on April 18, 1946).

References

External links
Memorandum of Conversation, by the Director of the Office of Near Eastern and African Affairs (Murray)

Ambassadors of the United States to Iran
1887 births
1965 deaths
20th-century American diplomats